Wang Zhenghua (born 1944) is a Chinese billionaire whose wealth derives from the airline he founded, Spring Airlines. He is a formal civil servant renowned in China's business community for his frugality.

References

Chinese billionaires
Living people
1944 births
Date of birth missing (living people)
Place of birth missing (living people)
20th-century Chinese businesspeople